The sucA RNA motif is a conserved RNA structure found in bacteria of the order Burkholderiales.  RNAs within this motif are always found in the presumed 5' UTR of sucA genes.  sucA encodes a subunit of an enzyme that participates in the citric acid cycle by synthesizing succinyl-CoA from 2-oxoglutarate.  A part of the conserved structure overlaps predicted Shine-Dalgarno sequences (involved in ribosome binding) of the downstream sucA genes.  Because of the RNA motif's consistent gene association and a possible mechanism for sequestering the ribosome binding site, it was proposed that the sucA RNA motif corresponds to a cis-regulatory element.  Its relatively complex secondary structure could indicate that it is a riboswitch.  However, the function of this RNA motif remains unknown.

See also
SucA-II RNA motif
SucC RNA motif

References

External links
 

Cis-regulatory RNA elements